Euthauma ghentianum is a species of tephritid or fruit flies in the genus Euthauma of the family Tephritidae.

Distribution
South Africa.

References

Tephritinae
Insects described in 1949
Diptera of Africa